The Malayan High School of Science (MHSS) is a private secondary educational institution established in 2005. It is managed and operated by the Mapúa University (MU). It is on a one-hectare property along P. Guazon Street (formerly Otis St.) in the district of Pandacan, City of Manila, Philippines.

History
The inauguration of MHSS was held on January 16, 2006, with then Manila Mayor Lito Atienza as guest speaker and MIT chairman Alfonso T. Yuchengco, former Senate president Jovito Salonga, former Prime Minister Cesar Virata, and Yuchengco Group of Companies (YGC) chairperson Helen Y. Dee in attendance.

The school opened its doors to 312 freshmen students and formally launched its first year of operation on June 14, 2006 under the administration of president, Dr. Reynaldo B. Vea, who is also the president of MIT.

Accreditation
MHSS is accredited by the Mathematics Teachers Association of the Philippines (MTAP) to be the only mathematics review center for Grade 6 and high school students in Manila.

Curriculum
Updated as of December 2017

Student organizations
 The Eco Warriors Club advocates a "greener" school through tree-planting activities, ecological seminars and the like. 
Malayan Kasaysayan is the official Social Sciences association of MHSS. The club organizes activities related to geography, history, politics, and other general social sciences that are relevant to the development of the school, country, and the global society.
The Math, Science, and Technology Society, also known as MaSciTech, provides a regular venue for MHSS students to express their extracurricular interests in the fields of math, science and technology. Members of this club compete in interschool quizzes and competitions.
The MusikaMalayan is the official school choir. This club aims to hone the students' skills in music.
The Peer Counselors are the right hand of the Center for Guidance and Counseling. They offer peer help and advice and act as ambassadors of goodwill on campus. This club is established to interact and reach out to Malayans, to touch lives and bring hope — enlighten minds that there are changes to be embraced 
The Sports Organization organizes all sports-related activities of the school. This club aims to develop/ harness potential MHSS students in athletic endeavor and enhance their social skills through actual participation in Intramurals provided by the School
The Supreme Student Government serves as the governing body for students at MHSS. The SSG represents the student body to the faculty and administration of MHSS, and represents the school in outside events and activities.
Whizzy Works is the official publication of MHSS, run by the students. It covers and documents all the important events MHSS is involved in on and off campus.

References

External links
Official website
Malayan Colleges Laguna
Mapúa Institute of Technology

Science high schools in Manila
Education in Pandacan
Educational institutions established in 2005
Mapúa University
2005 establishments in the Philippines
National Collegiate Athletic Association (Philippines) high schools